One Deep Breath is a French experimental film directed by Antony Hickling in 2014.

Plot
The film follows Maël (Manuel Blanc), traumatized by the suicide of his lover.

Cast
 Manuel Blanc: Maël
 Thomas Laroppe: Adam
 Stéphanie Michelini:  Patricia Kerouac
 André Schneider: Adrien
 Biño Sauitzvy: Death
 Magali Gaudou: Life

Awards
 One Deep Breath – Best experimental feature at Zinegoak film festival in Bilboa, Spain, 2015

References

External links
 

2014 films
2014 LGBT-related films
Films set in Paris
French LGBT-related films
2000s French films
2010s French films